Pekan may refer to:
Pekan District
Pekan (federal constituency), represented in the Dewan Rakyat
Pekan (state constituency), formerly represented in the Pahang State Council (1955–59)
Bandar Pekan (state constituency), formerly represented in the Pahang State Legislative Assembly (1974–86)